Joru is a 2014 Indian Telugu language romantic comedy film directed by Kumar Nagendra and produced by Ashok and Nagarjuna. Ram Pasupuleti worked as assistant director for this film. The film features Sundeep Kishan, Raashi Khanna, Priya Banerjee and Sushma Raj  in lead roles. The music was composed by Bheems Ceciroleo. The film was released on 7 November 2014.

The film was later dubbed into Hindi as Izzat Ke Khatir and released on YouTube on 1 September 2018 by Pen Movies Company .

Plot
Sundeep (Sundeep Kishan) bumps into NRI Annapoorna alias Anu (Raashi Khanna) during a road trip. As they go on, they are attacked quite a few times, and Sundeep finds out that she is the daughter of Sadasivam (Sayaji Shinde), the MLA of Vizag. Sundeep promises that he will safely drop her off with her father. The rest of the story shows Anu’s past, why they are being attacked, and what Sundeep has to do to save her.

Cast

 Sundeep Kishan as Sundeep
 Raashi Khanna as Annapoorna "Anu"
 Priya Banerjee as Poorna
 Sushma Raj as Sruthi
 Brahmanandam as Pellikoduku "PK"
 Sayaji Shinde as MLA Sadasivan/Anu's father (Dual Role)
 Saptagiri as Namalu
 Ajay as Bhavani
 Prudhvi Raj as Sundeep's father
 Hema as Sruthi's mother
 Kasi Viswanath as Sruthi's father
 Annapoorna as Anu's grandmother
 Satyam Rajesh as Siddhartha Raju
 Fish Venkat as PK's assistant

Soundtrack

The soundtrack of the film was composed by Bheems Ceciroleo. The soundtrack album consists of five songs, with lyrics by Sirivennela Seetharama Sastry, Vanamali and Bheems Ceciroleo. The eponymous track marks the singing debut of Raashii Khanna.

Reception
The Hindu gave a review and wrote that "Mindless fun can be entertaining when handled well. Joru is let down by incoherent writing and amateurish execution.". 123telugu gave a review rating of 2.5/5 and stated that "On the whole, ‘Joru’ ends up as just a below average entertainer. Too many characters and boring first half are the major drawbacks of the film. Sundeep Kishan and Raashi Khanna’s performance, climax, and Brahmi’s comedy are the only saving grace. You can only give this film a shot if you have absolutely nothing else to do". Times Of India gave 2/5 and stated that "At a run time of just around 140 minutes, the film makes you wonder if you have lost your sense of humour or if the joke is upon you".

References

External links
 

Indian romantic comedy films
2014 films
Indian action comedy films
2010s Telugu-language films
2014 action comedy films
2014 romantic comedy films
Films scored by Bheems Ceciroleo